Stary Sącz  is a small historic town in Lesser Poland Voivodeship of southern Poland. It is the seat of the Gmina Stary Sącz (commune), and one of the oldest towns in the country, having been founded in the 13th century.

Geography 

History 
The history of the town dates back to the Early Middle Ages when Duchess Kinga (Kinga of Poland) the daughter of the King Béla IV of Hungary and the wife of Duke Bolesław V the Chaste, received the land called Sącz, together with surrounding villages, from her husband in the year 1257. It is assumed to be the date of the town foundation. Indeed, the Duchess must have loved the mountains very much, since she founded a Convent of the Poor Clares there in 1280 and she became its duchess herself. Almost at the same time, on the opposite slope of the Sącz hill, the seat of a Franciscan order was established also by Duchess Kinga. In the year 1358 the town received a privilege of the Magdeburg law, confirmed by King Casimir III the Great. An extremely advantageous location, on a very busy trade route to Hungary, fostered the town's rapid development. However the town was often damaged by disasters, of which fires were the most harmful. The town also did not manage to escape floods, plagues and wars. During the biggest fire, in 1795, almost the entire town burned down.

Tourism, recreation and sport 
Visitors in Stary Sącz are provided not only with the town's rich history, unique medieval architecture and many monuments of ecclesiastical buildings. At the fork of the rivers Dunajec and Poprad is a recreation area with a few ponds. (Their overall surface is 14 ha). These ponds contain plenty of fish. There are carp, trout and sanders among them. There are even rainbow trout in a special fishery. These fish attract many anglers.
Miejska Góra (The town's Mountain) encourages hiking and cycling in beautiful wildlife surroundings.
Stary Sącz, situated in the lag of the Poprad Landscape Park is also the seat of the Park Service. One of Poland's biggest landscape parks stretches all over the range of the mountains Radziejowa and Jaworzyna in the Beskid Sądecki region. 
There are many trails waiting for keen hikers. Some of them start in Stary Sącz. The most attractive are:
- The Yellow Route – from the railway station in Stary Sącz via Moszczenica, Przysietnica into the Radziejowa range, where, on the Przehyba summit (1175 m), it joins The Red Route heading towards Krościenko.
- The Blue Route – begins at the railway station in Barcice and via Wola Krogulecka climbs the Makowica summit (948 m).
A very popular bike route goes from Stary Sącz to the Przehyba summit via Gołkowice and Skrudzina.

Stary Sącz is a place for many sporting events. Some of the most well attended are:

- The Polish Volleyball Championship of Forest-Schools with competitors from Denmark and Slovakia 
- The Open Mountain Cycling Youth Competition 
- The International Motorbike Rally 
- The Mayor's Cup Street Race 
- The All-Polish Ecological Rally 
- The New Year's Eve Race from Stary Sącz to Nowy Sącz

External links
 Jewish Community in Stary Sącz on Virtual Shtetl

Populated places established in the 13th century
Cities and towns in Lesser Poland Voivodeship
Nowy Sącz County
Kraków Voivodeship (14th century – 1795)
Kingdom of Galicia and Lodomeria
Kraków Voivodeship (1919–1939)